Bacon on the Side is a French romantic comedy film, released in 2010. Written and directed by Anne Depétrini, the film stars Ramzy Bedia and Anne Marivin as Djalil Boudaoud and Justine Lacroix, a surgeon and a television reporter who enter a romantic relationship despite the objections of their families to the cultural gap.

Cast 
 Ramzy Bedia as Djalil Boudaoud
 Anne Marivin as Justine Lacroix
 Marie-France Pisier as Nicole Lacroix
 Mohamed Fellag as Mahmoud Boudaoud
 Biyouna as Houria Boudaoud
 Jean-Luc Bideau as Charles Lacroix
 Géraldine Nakache as Sophie
 Leïla Bekhti as Anissa Boudaoud
 Arnaud Henriet as Mathieu
 Alex Lutz as Benoît Dubreuil
 Éric Judor as The vigil
 Frédéric Chau as Sophie's boyfriend
 Franck Gastambide, Medi Sadoun & Jib Pocthier as The 3 Swiss

Around the film 
Depétrini, Bedia's real-life wife at the time, wrote the film as a fictionalization of their own relationship.

The film won the Radio-Canada Audience Award at the 2011 Cinéfranco film festival.

References

External links
 

2010 films
2010 romantic comedy films
French romantic comedy films
2010s French-language films
French interfaith romance films
Films about interracial romance
2010s French films